Judge Rinder is a British arbitration-based reality court show that has been on air on ITV since 11 August 2014. The show depicts Robert Rinder as an arbitrator overseeing civil cases. Rinder began his career in criminal law in 2003. He is a barrister and wears his barrister robes while on the show, but does not wear the wig as is customary in the judiciary. Rinder is a practising criminal barrister at 2 Hare Court Chambers in London and this is made clear on the show. As with other related court shows that inspired it, such as Judge Judy, Judge Mathis and The People's Court, any awards handed down by Rinder are paid by the production company rather than the loser.

Show structure
The hearings are conducted in a studio styled as a television-related courtroom with entertainment styling, including a Union Jack flag and another flag with the show's logo and a gavel, neither of which are used in UK courts. The robes worn by Rinder are regular barristers' robes without the wig and, in England and Wales, most small claim trials are conducted in district judges' chambers. The show follows the same format as other television court shows, such as Judge Judy and Judge Mathis.

The claimant and defendant enter the courtroom separately, while the announcer Charles Foster announces their names (unlike Judge Judy, where full names are used. The litigants are only identified by their first names) along with details of the case and they take their places at their respective benches: the claimant on the judge's left, and the defendant on the judge's right. Rinder then asks the claimant and defendant to confirm their names, and the case proceeds. The bailiff on the show is Michelle Hassan, who passes items of evidence (photographs, receipts, copies of text messages etc.) between the litigants and Judge Rinder during proceedings, which can be displayed on a large video screen in the courtroom (with certain identifying information electronically blurred) when required. Hassan also brings a box of tissues or a glass of water to any litigant who should become distressed during their case, as well as escorting any additional witnesses into the courtroom and who give their evidence, standing in a dock on the same side of the room where she stands and out of the courtroom again afterwards.

References

External links

2014 British television series debuts
2010s British reality television series
2010s British legal television series
2020s British reality television series
2020s British legal television series
Court shows
ITV reality television shows
English-language television shows
Television series by ITV Studios
Television shows set in Manchester